"Cry" is a single by LL Cool J from his twelfth studio album, Exit 13 (2008). The song features guest vocals by R&B singer Lil' Mo and production by Andreas "Raw Uncut" Dombrowski. The song is noted for its sampling of Bunny Sigler's "Half a Man," and Ja Rule's "I Cry," which also happens to feature Lil' Mo. It was digitally released as an individual buzz single on June 17, 2008, and saw a limited international release as a B-side to the accompanying 12" single, "5 Boroughs," on June 24, 2008; alongside a US release on July 8, 2008.

Chart performance

References

2008 singles
2008 songs
LL Cool J songs
Lil' Mo songs
Songs written by Lil' Mo
Def Jam Recordings singles
Songs written by Kenny Gamble
Songs written by Leon Huff
Songs written by LL Cool J
Songs written by Bunny Sigler
Songs written by Ja Rule
Hip hop soul songs